Duut is a Dutch surname. Notable people with the surname include:

Emmanuel Kwame Duut (born 1959), Ghanaian politician 
Henk Duut (born 1964), Dutch association football defender
Michael Duut (born 1990), Dutch kickboxer 

Dutch-language surnames